Kristina Aleksandrovna Alikina (born 23 February 1986) is a Russian basketball power forward. She won a silver medal in the 2013–14 EuroCup and a bronze in the 2014–15 EuroLeague with Dyamo Kursk.

References

1986 births
Living people
Russian women's basketball players
Power forwards (basketball)
Sportspeople from Perm, Russia